Abhinoy Noy is a 1983 Indian Bengali language romance film directed by Archan Chakraborty.

Cast
 Aparna Sen
 Anup Kumar
 Samit Bhanja as Gamesh (Director)
 Santu Mukhopadhyay as Bhola & Bikram
 Asim Dutta as Hemlata (Heroine)
 Dilip Ray asDinu (Caretaker Of A Loge At Koshi Gram)
 Sambhu Bhattachayra
 Alpana Goswami as Pal (Film Producer)
 Ramen Chattopadhyay as Sumitra
 Debprasad Singh as Vikoge Popale
 Sumitra Mukherjee
 Kumkum Bhattacharya
 Sunil Bandyopadhyay

External links
 Abhinoy Noy at gomolo.in

1983 films
Bengali-language Indian films
1980s romance films
1980s Bengali-language films